Olympia School District is a school district (Washington school district number 111) serving 9,829 students (as of the 2020-2021 school year) in the city of Olympia in Thurston County, Washington. The school district has approximately 1200 staff members and maintains 19 campuses.

Schools

Other facilities

 District Headquarters at 111 Bethel St NE, Olympia, WA 98506.
 Transportation Department at 3000 RW Johnson Blvd SW, Tumwater, WA 98512.
 Support Service Center at 1914 Wilson St SE, Olympia, WA 98501.

Board of directors
The Olympia School Board currently has five voting members. The voting members in 2023 are:

 District 1: Director Maria Flores
 District 2: Director Talauna Reed
 District 3: Director Darcy Huffman (Board President)
 District 4: Director Hilary Seidel (Board Vice President)
 District 5: Director Scott Clifthorne 

The Olympia School Board also has four student representatives. The students serve in an advisory capacity at board meetings and may cast non-binding, advisory votes on motions before the board. The student representatives for the 2022-2023 school year are:

 Capital HS: Rahma Gaye 
 Avanti HS: Ali Owen
 ORLA: Ru'ya Russell
 Olympia HS: Christine Zhang

References

External links
 

Education in Olympia, Washington
Education in Thurston County, Washington
School districts in Washington (state)
School districts established in 1852